The 1983 Greenlandic Men's Football Championship was the 13th edition of the Greenlandic Men's Football Championship. The final round was held in Paamiut. It was won by Nagdlunguaq-48 who defeated CIF-70 Qasigiannguit in the final.

See also
Football in Greenland
Football Association of Greenland
Greenland national football team
Greenlandic Men's Football Championship

References

Greenlandic Men's Football Championship seasons
Green
Green
Foot